Obispo Formation may refer to:
 Obispo Formation, Bolivia, an Ordovician geologic formation in Bolivia
 Obispo Formation, California, a tuff formation in California
 Obispo Formation, Spain, a Late Jurassic geologic formation in Spain